Françoise Leroux, born Philippe on 4 October 1961 at Limoges, is a former French athlete, who specialised in the sprints, and who ran for club CA Marignane SA. She competed in the women's 100 metres at the 1988 Summer Olympics.

Prize list

International

References

External links  
 

Living people
1961 births
Athletes (track and field) at the 1988 Summer Olympics
French female sprinters
Olympic athletes of France
Olympic female sprinters